Streptomyces guanduensis is an acidophilic bacterium species from the genus of Streptomyces which has been isolated from pine forest soil from Guandu in the Yunnan Province in China.

See also 
 List of Streptomyces species

References

Further reading

External links
Type strain of Streptomyces guanduensis at BacDive -  the Bacterial Diversity Metadatabase

guanduensis
Bacteria described in 2006